In the film industry, unsimulated sex is the presentation of sex scenes in which actors genuinely perform the depicted sex acts, rather than simulating them. Although it is ubiquitous in films intended as pornographic, it is very uncommon in other films. At one time in the United States, such scenes were restricted by law and self-imposed industry standards such as the Motion Picture Production Code. Films showing explicit sexual activity were confined to privately distributed underground films, such as stag films or "porn loops". In the 1960s, social attitudes about sex began to shift, and sexually explicit films were decriminalized in many countries.

With movies such as Blue Movie by Andy Warhol, mainstream movies began pushing boundaries in terms of what was presented on screen. Notable examples include two of the eight Bedside-films and the six Zodiac-films from the 1970s, all of which were produced in Denmark and had many pornographic sex scenes, but were nevertheless considered mainstream films, all having mainstream casts and crews, and premiering in mainstream cinemas. The last of these films, Agent 69 Jensen i Skyttens tegn, was made in 1978. From the end of the 1970s until the late 1990s it was rare to see hardcore scenes in mainstream cinema, but this changed with the success of Lars von Trier's The Idiots (1998), which heralded a wave of art-house films with explicit content, such as Romance (1999), Baise-moi (2000), Intimacy (2001), Vincent Gallo's The Brown Bunny (2003), and Michael Winterbottom's 9 Songs (2004). Some simulated sex scenes are sufficiently realistic that critics mistakenly believe that they are real, such as the cunnilingus scene in the 2006 film Red Road.

Unsimulated/real vs. visible/explicit/hard-core - terminology 
Although it is common to discuss films for which the actors had sex on set using terms such as 'real sex' or 'unsimulated sex', some film scholars tend to prefer talking about 'visible sex', 'explicit sex' or 'hard-core sex'. Linda Williams, for instance, proposes that "we eliminate the awkward term unsimulated sex entirely". This is also because most film censors have predominantly focussed on whether sex acts (penetration, fellatio, cunnilingus) or aroused genitals are visible when deciding whether a film should be classified as pornographic or able to be distributed on general release. For instance, it was not uncommon for two versions of pornographic films to be released - a hardcore version subject to restrictions, and a softcore version passed at '18' level. In both cases, the actors did indeed perform sex acts on set, but they were only visible on the hardcore version and not on the softcore version. Moreover, there has been a huge blurring of the distinctions between the use of prostheses (in Trouble Every Day, Blue is the Warmest Colour, Battle in Heaven, Holiday), actual genital contact between actors (Intimacy, Baise-moi, The Brown Bunny, 9 Songs) and genitals added in post-production (Irreversible). In terms of the experience of watching the film, and often from censors' and critics' perspective, it is more important to note whether penetration/fellatio/cunnilingus is visible on the screen, rather than to question exactly what took place on set. 

The idea of 'simulation' also relates to questions about acting, unnecessarily denigrating pornography, and is too vague about what exactly is being simulated. For instance, while an actor's penis may enter an actress's vagina on a porn set, this does not mean that each of their actions, emotions, noises, and so on, are not performed in quite a different way to how they would have sex in the privacy of their own home: "it is both real—something that actually happens between people—and a fake, staged for the camera and sound equipment. Neither the directors of pornography nor the directors of hard-core art, from Warhol forward, document “real sex” in the sense of what people do alone, in private." As such, to describe the sex on a porn set as 'real' or 'unsimulated' is to focus on just one small element of the scene (here, penetration) and omits all other parts of the performance. Who is to say what is real or simulated? On the other hand, viewers can all pause a film and agree upon what is visible.

Rationales
In an interview after the release of his film Love (2015), when asked why audiences want to see realistic portrayals of sex, Gaspar Noé suggested it's really about power structures: "In most societies whether they're western or not, people want to control the sexual behaviour or to organise it in a precise context. Sex is like a danger zone. Sometimes class barriers fall down and it scares a lot of people. It's about states controlling their systems, like religion."

James Franco has cited "aesthetics and personal reasons" for why he worked on Interior. Leather Bar. (2013):

Production issues
A few directors have openly discussed or written about the technical problems inherent in filming of actual sexual acts, particularly with actors or actresses who have never performed such acts on film. In an interview with BlackBook, Gaspar Noé acknowledges that it is difficult for several reasons: an actor may not be able to get or maintain an erection in the presence of even a small crew, or on camera; either of the participants may have a current partner. "So I've decided that the best way to show real sex is to cast two single people who used to be a couple."

Pornographic films re-edited for mainstream release
Prior to the advent of home video, a number of hardcore pornography films were released to mainstream cinemas. In most cases, scenes of penetration were either cut out or replaced with alternate shots. One exception to this was Deep Throat, which was released uncensored.

Examples of this type of hybrid release include Café Flesh (1982)—the R-rated version of this science fiction porn film was released to mainstream cinemas; Stocks and Blondes (1984), originally available as Wanda Whips Wall Street; and Droid (1988), originally released as Cabaret Sin in 1987.

In films 
The following mainstream films have scenes with verified real sexual activity, meaning actors or actresses are filmed engaging in actual coitus or performing related sexual acts such as fellatio and cunnilingus. This list does not include documentaries about pornography, which may contain unsimulated sexual activity.

In music videos

See also 

 Exploitation film
 Art house film
 Film censorship in the United States

References

General references
 McNair, Brian. (2013) Porno? Chic!: how pornography changed the world and made it a better place. Routledge. DOI: https://doi.org/10.4324/9780203134153
 Coleman, Lindsay. (ed.) (2016) Sex and Storytelling in Modern Cinema: Explicit Sex, Performance and Cinematic Technique. London ; New York, NY: I.B.Tauris.
 Frey, Mattias. (2016) Extreme Cinema: The Transgressive Rhetoric of Today’s Art Film Culture. London: Rutgers University Press. DOI: https://doi.org/10.36019/9780813576527
 Kenny, Oliver. (2022) ‘Breaking Conventions? Political Ideology of Films With Explicit Sex’, Open Screens, 5(1), pp. 1–21. https://doi.org/10.16995/OS.8008.
 Krzywinska, Tanya. (2006) Sex and the cinema. London: Wallflower.
 Lewis, Jon. (2009) ‘Real sex: aesthetics and economics of art-house porn’, Jump Cut: A Review of Contemporary Media, 51. https://www.ejumpcut.org/archive/jc51.2009/LewisRealsex/text.html
 Villadsen, Ebbe (2005): Danish Erotic Film Classics.
 Williams, Linda. (2008) Screening sex. Durham, NC: Duke University Press.* Williams, Linda Ruth (2005): The Erotic Thriller in Contemporary Cinema. Indiana University Press. .

Inline citations

Lists of films by common content
Sexuality in popular culture
Sexuality-related lists
Sexuality in fiction